Kroo or KROO may refer to:

KROO (AM), a radio station (1430 AM) licensed to serve Breckenridge, Texas, United States
Kroo (bank), a UK bank
Kru languages